St. John Chrysostom Byzantine Catholic Church is a historic Eastern Catholic church in Pittsburgh, Pennsylvania, United States. It is located in the neighborhood of Four Mile Run, which is an isolated section of Greenfield at the bottom of Junction Hollow. Its address is 506 Saline Street.

Today it is best known for having been the family church of the artist Andy Warhol. Because it faces the heavily traveled Interstate 376, or Parkway East, it is an architectural landmark for many commuters who look upon its onion domes and Slavic-style crosses.

History

A parish of the Byzantine Catholic Metropolitan Church of Pittsburgh, the American branch of the Ruthenian Catholic Church, St. John Chrysostom Church was established in 1910 by Rusyn immigrants from the Carpathian Mountains. Most came to work in Pittsburgh's steel industry. Large numbers of Rusyns settled in a small valley called Four Mile Run, a part of the Greenfield neighborhood and adjacent to a large steel mill of the Jones and Laughlin Steel Company. Rusyn immigrants themselves dubbed the small settlement "Ruska Dolina", which translates as Rusyn Valley.

The church first met there in a hall on Saline Street. Rev. Alexij Petrasovich assumed his duties in August 1910, and the same year the church purchased five lots on Saline Street. The Greek Catholic Union of the USA helped to finance construction of the first church. By 1931 a larger building was needed to accommodate the growth of the parish. The congregation moved down the street to Saline and Anthony Streets, where the new and present church was completed in 1932. The original church served as a social hall until the 1960s.

The Byzantine Catholic Metropolitan Church of Pittsburgh's radio ministry began at St. John Chrysostom Church with broadcasts of Sunday Divine Liturgies in 1956. The Rev. John Bilock was the celebrant.

During the years 1994–1997 a church renovation project added new lighting and new icons by New Guild Studio throughout the church.

Andy Warhol
Andy Warhol was baptized here and the Warhola family worshiped at the church during the artist's formative years (1928–1949) in Pittsburgh. They walked to services each week from their home on Dawson Street in Oakland. Some art historians speculate about the influence of the church's numerous and repeating icons on Andy Warhol's famous Pop Art style.

Sources

External links

 Saint John Chrysostom Byzantine Catholic Church – Official Web Site
 Photos of icons & church interior, St. John Chrysostom Byzantine Catholic Church

20th-century Roman Catholic church buildings in the United States
Andy Warhol
Byzantine Catholic Metropolia of Pittsburgh
Churches in Pittsburgh
Eastern Catholic churches in Pennsylvania
Greenfield (Pittsburgh)
Roman Catholic churches completed in 1932
Rusyn-American culture in Pennsylvania